Bathtub gin refers to any style of homemade spirit made in amateur conditions. The term first appeared in 1920, in the prohibition-era United States, in reference to the poor-quality alcohol that was being made.

As gin was the predominant drink in the 1920s, many variations were created by mixing cheap grain alcohol with water and flavorings and other agents, such as juniper berry juice and glycerin. In addition, mixing grain alcohol, water, and flavorings in vessels large enough to supply commercial users had to be small enough for the operation to go undetected by the police. The common metal bathtub in use at the time would have been ideal as would have been a ceramic bathtub, hence the name, 'bathtub gin'. However, since distillation is boiling and condensation in a closed apparatus, and cannot be accomplished in an open vessel such as a bathtub, stories of distilled alcoholic products produced in an open bathtub are likely untrue.

Many gin cocktails such as Bee's Knees owe their existence to bathtub gin, as they were also created in order to mask the unpleasant taste.

See also 

 Fusel alcohol
 Prohibition
 History of alcohol
 Alcoholic beverage
 Distilled beverages
 List of cocktails
 List of alcoholic beverages
 Moonshine

References

Distilled drinks
1920s
American culture
History of North America
Prohibition in the United States